Okamoto (written: 岡本 literally "hill base") is the 48th most common Japanese surname.
 Notable people with the surname include:

, Japanese fashion model and actress
, professional Nippon Professional Baseball player
, Japanese actress and voice actress
, Japanese professional golfer
, Japanese woman who was convicted of killing her own daughter
, Japanese boxer
, Japanese musician
Haruko Okamoto (née Ishida, born 1945), Japanese figure skater
Hayato Okamoto (disambiguation), multiple people
, Japanese rower
, Japanese football player
, Japanese mathematician
, guitarist of the Japanese pop band Garnet Crow
, pen-name of a Japanese author, tanka poet, and Buddhism scholar
, Japanese singer and member of the group Hey! Say! JUMP
, Japanese author
, Japanese film director
, Japanese painter and illustrator
, member of the Japanese armed militant group, Japanese Red Army (JRA)
, retired female tennis player from Japan
, Japanese manga artist
, Japanese actress and voice actress
, Japanese volleyball player
, Japanese football player
, Japanese actress, voice actress and singer
, Japanese singer-songwriter
Mike Okamoto (born Detroit, United States), American comic book artist and commercial illustrator
, Japanese politician of Komeito
, Japanese politician of the Democratic Party of Japan
, Japanese tarento, race queen and gravure idol
, Japanese fashion model and actress
, Japanese actress and fashion model
, Japanese hammer thrower
, Japanese voice actor
Rai Okamoto (1927–1993), American architect, planner, and author
, Japanese model and actress
, Japanese kickboxer
, Japanese footballer
, Japanese boxer
, Japanese footballer and manager
, Japanese model and actress
, Japanese artist noted for abstract and avant-garde paintings and sculpture
Tetsuo Okamoto (1932–2007), Brazilian swimmer
Tomotaka Okamoto (disambiguation), multiple people
Vincent Okamoto (1943–2020), American Army officer and judge
, Japanese football player
, Japanese kokugaku scholar
Yoichi Okamoto (1915–1985), American photographer
, first Japanese athlete to become an Olympic taekwondo medalist
, video game designer credited with producing many of Capcom's popular titles
, Japanese politician of the Liberal Democratic Party
, Japanese footballer
Yukiko Okamoto (disambiguation), multiple people

See also
6244 Okamoto, a main-belt asteroid
Okamoto Station (Hyōgo), railway station of the Hankyu Kobe Line in Higashinada-ku, Kobe
Okamoto–Uchiyama cryptosystem, discovered in 1998 by T. Okamoto and S. Uchiyama
Okamoto's, a rock band whose members each adopted stage names with the surname Okamoto
Taro Okamoto Award, award for Contemporary Art (TARO Award)

References

Japanese-language surnames